Marjanlu (also Romanized as Marjānlū; also known as Mīrjānlū) is a village in Shurakat-e Jonubi Rural District, Ilkhchi District, Osku County, East Azerbaijan Province, Iran. At the 2006 census, its population was 356, in 84 families.

References 

Populated places in Osku County